Parliamentary elections were held in Czechoslovakia on 14 June 1964. They were the first held after a new constitution was adopted in July 1960.

Voters were presented with a single list from the National Front, dominated by the Communist Party of Czechoslovakia (KSČ). According to official figures, 99.4 percent of eligible voters turned out to vote, and 99.9 percent of those who voted approved the National Front list. Within the Front, the Communists had a large majority of 217 seats–145 for the main party and 72 for the Slovak branch.

Non-Communist members appeared on the National Front list in order to keep up the appearance of pluralism. However, seats were allocated in accordance with a set percentage, and no party could take part in the political process without KSČ approval.

Results

References

Czechoslovakia
Parliamentary election
Elections in Communist Czechoslovakia
Parliamentary election
Single-candidate elections
Czechoslovakia